Samsung GT-B7330 (also known as Omnia Pro B7330) is a smartphone produced by Samsung as part of their Omnia series line of mobile phones. It runs Windows Mobile 6.5 Standard. The phone has a QWERTY keyboard. The predecessor of this phone is the Samsung OmniaPRO B7320. It was released in October 2009.

Features

Main features
GSM Quad band (850/900/1800/1900 MHz)
EDGE network
3.5G
Wi-Fi
Bluetooth
AGPS
Speakerphone
Phone Memory: 200MB, Storage Memory: 400MB
Memory card slot (microSD up to 32GB)
Microsoft Office Mobile
Internet Explorer Mobile 6.0
Adobe Reader LE
Windows Mobile 6.5 Standard
FM radio with RDS
3.2 Megapixel camera
Video recording (320×240 pixels)
SMS
MMS
Email
Calendar
Contacts
Scheduler
Offline mode
Microsoft ActiveSync
Alarm
Audio notes
Calculator
Converter (Currency, Length, Weight, Volume, Area, Temperature)
Search
Smart reader
Stopwatch
Tasks
Tip calculator
World clock
Games
Java MIDP 2.1
Music Player
Call History
Photo Slides
Podcast reader
RSS feeds reader
Speed dial
Streaming Player
Windows Media
Task Manager
Voice notes
Facebook
Windows Marketplace for Mobile
Windows Live (Hotmail, Messenger, Spaces, Search, Contacts)
Microsoft My Phone
Multi-task
Minimize windows

Special features
Pressure-sensitive navigation key (up & down only)

Home screen
From this device's default home screen, the user can check the weather, play songs, update CNN headlines, view photos, configure device settings, and go to social-networking sites like Facebook, Myspace, and YouTube. However, if the home screen is changed from 'Samsung WizPro' (which is the default home screen layout) to other layouts (like 'Windows Basic'), these features will be unavailable until the home screen layout is changed back to the default.

References

External links

Samsung Mobile UK - Omnia Pro B7330 Overview

Windows Mobile Standard devices
GT-B7330
Mobile phones introduced in 2009